Macrobathra zonodesma is a moth in the family Cosmopterigidae. It was described by Oswald Bertram Lower in 1900. It is found in Australia, where it has been recorded from New South Wales.

References

Macrobathra
Moths described in 1900